Tony Robinson: Coast to Coast is a television programme first aired on Friday 17 March 2017 on Channel Five and hosted by Sir Tony Robinson.

History
The programme follows Sir Tony Robinson walking across the North of England, from the west coast to the east coast following in the footsteps of Alfred Wainwright and his Coast to Coast Walk.

While walking along the path, starting in Cumbria and finishing at Robin Hood Bay in Yorkshire, he shows local history, scenery and the way of life of the local people.

Episode list

References

External links
 

2017 British television series debuts
2017 British television series endings
Channel 5 (British TV channel) original programming
English-language television shows